Fu Lei (Fou Lei; ; courtesy name Nu'an 怒安, pseudonym Nu'an 怒庵; 1908–1966) was a Chinese translator and critic. His translation theory was dubbed the most influential in French-Chinese translation. He was known for his renowned renditions of Balzac and Romain Rolland.

Born in Nanhui, today a district of Shanghai, Fu was raised by his mother. Between 1928 and 1931 he read literature and art history in Paris, befriending, amongst others, Jacques Maritain and Jean Daniélou. Between 1932 and 1934 he taught art history at Shanghai Art Academy. An occasional critic and curator, for the most part of his working life, Fu Lei translated full-time.

In 1958 Fu was labelled a rightist in the Anti-Rightist Movement, and was politically persecuted. In 1966, at the beginning of the Cultural Revolution, he and his wife Zhu Meifu committed suicide. His letters to his son, the pianist Fou Ts'ong, were published in 1981. Fu Lei's Family Letters is a long-standing best-seller.

Scholarship
Fu's close relationship with the artist Huang Binhong is the subject of the 2009 monograph, Friendship in Art: Fou Lei and Huang Binhong, by the Australian scholar Claire Roberts. 

Fu's life and work is the subject of the 2017 monograph, Fou Lei: An Insistence on Truth, by the Chinese-British scholar Mingyuan Hu. It chronicles the hitherto unknown Parisian milieu and intellectual formation of Fu Lei through archival documents unearthed in France. Reviewing Fou Lei: An Insistence on Truth, the sinologist and literary scholar John Minford wrote: “Here this absorbing book breaks new and fascinating ground, offering crucial evidence of the growth of a great translator’s mind.”

Legacy
The Fu Lei Translation and Publishing Award was created in 2009 by the French Embassy in China to recognize the works of Chinese translators and publishers translated from French publications.

Works
Translations
 1932: Rodin L'Art by 
 1933: Chalot by Soupault
 1934: 20 Lectures on World Masterpieces of Art
 1934: Vie de Tolstoi by Rolland
 1934: Vie de Michel-Ange by Rolland
 1935: Voltaire by Maurois
 1942: Vie de Beethoven by Rolland
 1949: Eugénie Grandet by Balzac
 1950: Le Père Goriot by Balzac
 1953: Colomba by Mérimée
 1953: Jean-Christophe by Rolland
 1955: Candide by Voltaire
 1956: Zadig by Voltaire
 1963: Philosophie de l'art by Taine
 Cousin Bette, Le Cousin Pons, Colonel Chabert and some other works by Balzac
 The Conquest of Happiness by Bertrand Russell
Letters
 (Chinese:傅雷家书)

See also
 Fu Lei's residence in Shanghai opened as a museum in 2019.
 Death 死 by Chen Cun 陈村, short story in which the narrator visits the old home of Fu Lei, a dialogue with Fu Lei's ghost on the meaning of life.

References

1908 births

1966 suicides

French–Chinese translators
Suicides during the Cultural Revolution
Joint suicides
Artists from Shanghai
Republic of China translators
People's Republic of China translators
Writers from Shanghai
20th-century Chinese translators
Burials in Shanghai
Victims of the Anti-Rightist Campaign
Victims of human rights abuses
Nanyang Model High School alumni